George Merry (28 April 1929 – 6 August 2000) was a Canadian alpine skier who competed in the 1952 Winter Olympics.

References

External links
 

1929 births
2000 deaths
Canadian male alpine skiers
Olympic alpine skiers of Canada
Alpine skiers at the 1952 Winter Olympics